Oscar Núñez Olivas (born May 21, 1955 in San José) is a Costa Rican journalist and author. He has published four novels in Spanish, the first of which, El Teatro Circular (1997) won the Latin America Novel Prize of Editorial Universitaria Centroamericana (EDUCA) and the National Costa Rican prize the following year. He then published Los Gallos de San Esteban, a book set in the rural village of San Esteban in Olancho, Honduras and published in 2000. His third novel, the 2004 En clave de luna is also set in Honduras. An English language version, entitled Cadence of the Moon, was published in the United Kingdom by Aflame Books en 2007. His most recent novel is La Guerra Prometida, a story which refers to the Costa Rica national struggle against the American filibuster William Walker, who intended to take over Central American countries in the 19th century.

References

1955 births
Living people
Writers from San José, Costa Rica
Costa Rican male writers